Vondell Darr Wilson (April 18, 1919 – September 10, 2012) was an American actress. She achieved success in the late 1920s as a child actor and later played bit parts in her adult years. Her last role was in The Chocolate Soldier in 1941. Darr died on September 10, 2012.

Partial filmography

The City That Never Sleeps (1924) - Baby Molly
One Glorious Night (1924) - Mary
Border Vengeance (1925) - Bumps Jackson
The Pony Express (1925) - Baby
The Golden Cocoon (1925)
The Blind Goddess (1926)
Silence (1926) - Flower girl
On Trial (1928) - Doris Strickland
The Dummy (1929) - Peggy Meredith
That Certain Age (1938) - Friend
Andy Hardy Gets Spring Fever (1939) - Prompter (uncredited)
Scouts to the Rescue (1939) - Mary Scanlon
Strike Up the Band (1940) - Indian Love Lyrics Student (uncredited)
Little Nellie Kelly (1940) - Girl Dancing with Boy at Dance (uncredited)
More Trifles of Importance (1941) (short) - Patient
Men of Boys Town (1941) - Agnes, Whitey's Marysport Dance Partner (uncredited)
The Chocolate Soldier (1941) - Autograph Seeker (uncredited)

Personal life
Vondell Darr was born in Los Angeles Ralph Darr and Homa Dupree Darr. She met her husband, Fred Wilson, in high school, and the pair lived in Encino, Rancho Mirage and Lake Arrowhead during their marriage. The couple had three children.

References

External links

American silent film actresses
American child actresses
1919 births
2012 deaths
20th-century American actresses
21st-century American women